Wiped Out may refer to:
	
Wiped Out, children's book by Tempany Deckert, 2007
Wiped Out (Raven album), 1982
Wiped Out!, an album by The Neighbourhood, 2015
"Wiped Out", a song by Ace Frehley and Kiss from Ace Frehley, 1978	
"Wiped Out", a song by The Damned from Phantasmagoria, 1985